Genoa Township is one of nineteen townships in DeKalb County, USA. At the 2010 census, its population was 5,704 and it contained 2,187 housing units.

History
Genoa Township is named after Genoa, New York.

Geography

Cities, towns, villages
 Genoa (east three-quarters)

Unincorporated towns
 New Lebanon at

Cemeteries
 Genoa
 Ney

Airports and landing strips
 Aero Lake Estates Airport
 Ramme Airport
 Richard C Watson Airport

Demographics

School districts
 Central Community Unit School District 301
 Community Unit School District 300
 Genoa-Kingston Community Unit School District 424

Political districts
 Illinois's 16th congressional district
 State House District 69
 State Senate District 35

References
 
 US Census Bureau 2009 TIGER/Line Shapefiles
 US National Atlas

External links
 City-Data.com
 Illinois State Archives
 Township Officials of Illinois
 DeKalb County Official Site

Townships in DeKalb County, Illinois
1849 establishments in Illinois
Townships in Illinois